Anaeudora is a genus of bristle flies in the family Tachinidae. There are at least two described species in Anaeudora.

Species
These two species belong to the genus Anaeudora:
 Anaeudora apicalis (Matsumura, 1916) c g
 Anaeudora japanica (Baranov, 1935) c g
Data sources: i = ITIS, c = Catalogue of Life, g = GBIF, b = Bugguide.net

References

Further reading

External links

 
 

Tachinidae